Ultimate Dirty Dancing is a soundtrack album containing every song from the 1987 film Dirty Dancing, sequenced in the order it appears in the film. It was released on December 9, 2003, by RCA Records.

Track listing
Track listing
"Be My Baby" – The Ronettes
"Big Girls Don't Cry" – Frankie Valli & The Four Seasons
"Merengue" – Michael Lloyd & Le Disc
"Trot the Fox" – Michael Lloyd & Le Disc
"Johnny's Mambo" – Michael Lloyd & Le Disc
"Time of My Life" (instrumental version) – The John Morris Orchestra
"Where Are You Tonight?" – Tom Johnston
"Do You Love Me" – The Contours
"Love Man" – Otis Redding
"Gazebo Waltz" – Michael Lloyd
"Stay" – Maurice Williams and the Zodiacs
"Wipe Out" – The Surfaris
"Hungry Eyes" – Eric Carmen
"Overload" – Zappacosta
"Hey! Baby" – Bruce Channel
"De Todo Un Poco" – Michael Lloyd & Le Disc
"Some Kind of Wonderful" – The Drifters
"These Arms of Mine" – Otis Redding
"Cry to Me" – Solomon Burke
"Will You Love Me Tomorrow" – The Shirelles
"Love Is Strange" – Mickey & Sylvia
"You Don't Own Me" – The Blow Monkeys
"Yes" – Merry Clayton
"In the Still of the Night" – The Five Satins
"She's Like the Wind" – Patrick Swayze
"Kellerman's Anthem" – The Emile Bergstein Chorale
"(I've Had) The Time of My Life" – Bill Medley & Jennifer Warnes

Charts

Weekly charts

Year-end chart

Certifications

References

2003 soundtrack albums
Drama film soundtracks
RCA Records soundtracks
Romance film soundtracks
Sequel albums